James Franklin Dempsey (May 27, 1925 – June 1, 2013) was an American college and professional football player who was a linebacker and lineman in the National Football League (NFL) and the Canadian Football League (CFL) for six seasons in the 1950s.  Dempsey played college football for the University of Florida, and thereafter, he played professionally for the Chicago Bears of the NFL and the Hamilton Tiger-Cats and Ottawa Rough Riders of the CFL.

Early years 

Dempsey was born in Dothan, Alabama in 1925.  He attended Miami Senior High School in Miami, Florida, and he played high school football for the Miami Stingarees.

College career 

Dempsey attended the University of Florida in Gainesville, Florida, where he played for coach Raymond Wolf's Florida Gators football team from 1946 to 1949.  He was a standout lineman on offense and defense for the Gators at the lowest point in the history of their football program, ironically dubbed the "Golden Era" by the players.  Dempsey graduated from the University of Florida with a bachelor's degree in physical education in 1950, and he was later inducted into the University of Florida Athletic Hall of Fame as a "Gator Great" in 1971.

Dempsey was remembered as a good-natured mischief maker and for the pranks and activities of his teammates that revolved around his World War II-era surplus Jeep.

Professional career 

He was a versatile player, and at different times, he played both offense and defense, including linebacker, guard and tackle.

Dempsey played his final two professional seasons in the CFL, first for the Hamilton Tiger-Cats in 1954 and the first part of 1955, and then for the Ottawa Rough Riders during the latter part of the 1955 season.  He was selected as a CFL East All-Star in the first CFL All-Star Game in 1955.

Life after football 

After Dempsey's professional football career ended, he remained in Canada and became the owner of a successful fire arms and sporting goods store.  In retirement, he lived in Oakville, Ontario, where he died June 1, 2013.

See also 

 Florida Gators football, 1940–49
 List of Chicago Bears players
 List of Florida Gators in the NFL Draft
 List of University of Florida alumni
 List of University of Florida Athletic Hall of Fame members

References

Bibliography 

 Carlson, Norm, University of Florida Football Vault: The History of the Florida Gators, Whitman Publishing, LLC, Atlanta, Georgia (2007).  .
 Golenbock, Peter, Go Gators!  An Oral History of Florida's Pursuit of Gridiron Glory, Legends Publishing, LLC, St. Petersburg, Florida (2002).  .
 Hairston, Jack, Tales from the Gator Swamp: A Collection of the Greatest Gator Stories Ever Told, Sports Publishing, LLC, Champaign, Illinois (2002).  .
 McCarthy, Kevin M.,  Fightin' Gators: A History of University of Florida Football, Arcadia Publishing, Mount Pleasant, South Carolina (2000).  .
 McEwen, Tom, The Gators: A Story of Florida Football, The Strode Publishers, Huntsville, Alabama (1974).  .
 Nash, Noel, ed., The Gainesville Sun Presents The Greatest Moments in Florida Gators Football, Sports Publishing, Inc., Champaign, Illinois (1998).  .

1925 births
2013 deaths
American football defensive linemen
American football linebackers
American football offensive linemen
Chicago Bears players
Florida Gators football players
Hamilton Tiger-Cats players
Ottawa Rough Riders players
Players of American football from Miami
Sportspeople from Dothan, Alabama
Miami Senior High School alumni
Players of Canadian football from Miami